Robert Gordon "Bobby" Bath (born 1936) is an Australian boxer. He competed in the men's bantamweight event at the 1956 Summer Olympics. At the 1956 Summer Olympics he defeated Hempala Jayasuriya of Ceylon, before losing to Song Soon-chun of South Korea. He is from Buninyong, Ballarat.

References

External links
 

1936 births
Living people
Australian male boxers
Olympic boxers of Australia
Boxers at the 1956 Summer Olympics
Place of birth missing (living people)
Bantamweight boxers